Alfred Brooks may refer to:

 Alfred Brooks (cricketer) (1846–1911), English cricketer
 Alfred Brooks (dancer) (1916–2005), American modern dancer, founder of a modern dance company called Munt-Brooks
 Alfred Brooks, English businessman, co-founder of Justerini & Brooks
 Alfred Brooks, title character of Robert Lipsyte's novel, The Contender
 Alfred Hulse Brooks (1871–1924), American geologist
 Alfred Johnson Brooks (1890–1967), Canadian barrister, educator, and politician from New Brunswick
 Alfred Leroy Brooks (1858–1927), American physician and politician from Iowa

See also
 Alfred Deakin Brookes (1920–2005), Australian spy